Circles.Life is a multinational mobile virtual network operator (MVNO) based in Singapore. The company was founded in 2016, initially operating exclusively in Singapore, leasing its network from M1.

In July 2015, Liberty Wireless signed an agreement with M1 Limited that allowed it to tap on M1's mobile network, thus becoming the first MVNO, operating as Circles Asia, in Singapore to offer a full service mobile network experience. It has since expanded to Taiwan and Australia, where it leases the Chunghwa Telecom and Optus networks, respectively.

It has no phone customer service, with the only support channels available to its customers being live chat and email.

In February 2019, the company announced that it had closed an undisclosed round of funding with Sequoia India and its plans to expand in five new markets, including Taiwan and Australia over the next 18 months. The company has expanded its offerings by launching digital lifestyle features such as its AI-driven events and movie-based platform, 'Discover'. In June 2019, the company closed another round of funding for an undisclosed amount led by Singapore’s Government-linked EDBI and Founders Fund. This marks the first time the Silicon Valley-based Founders Fund has invested in a telco.

The company launched into its first overseas market, Taiwan in June 2019, followed by Australia in September 2019.

History 
2016

 June 2016: Circles.Life launches, making it Singapore's fourth telco.

2018

 March 2018: Circles.Life launches Unlimited Data on Demand, to provide customers with a daily Unlimited Data option. It also adds the option of Unlimited Outgoing Calls.

2019

 February 2019: Circles.Life announces that it has closed an undisclosed round of funding with Sequoia India.
 June 2019: Circles.Life expands into its first overseas market, Taiwan.
 June 2019: Circles.Life announces that it has closed an undisclosed round of funding with Singapore's Government-linked EDBI and Founders Fund.
 August 2019: Circles.Life expands to its second overseas market, Australia.
2020

 February 2020: Circles.Life announces that it has closed an undisclosed round of funding with Warburg Pincus.
 March 2020: Circles.Life launches in Indonesia as Live.On.

2022

 July 2022: Circles.Life was reportedly in early talks to merge with SPAC Bridgetown in a US$2.5B deal. This could be the third SPAC merger with a Singaporean company, the second in 2022. After Grab (listed in 2021) and PropertyGuru (listed in 2022), to be listed in the

Markets 

Operating as a digital telco, it purchases bandwidth from other MNOs, replacing traditional brick-and-mortar stores with its own online consumer business. This enables Circles.Life to provide voice, messaging, and data services to customers; becoming the first digital telco in Singapore to offer full service mobile network services. To do away with physical retail stores, Circles.Life delivers its SIM cards and mobile phones to customers through third party services, such as SingPost in Singapore.

Singapore 

In July 2015, Circles.Life's parent company, Liberty Wireless Pte Ltd, signed an agreement with M1 Limited to deliver voice, messaging, and data services as an MVNO using M1's mobile network, which has 4G+ outdoor coverage of 99.92% of Singapore. The company's offering launched to the public in June 2016. Customers may also choose to pick up its SIM cards at selected convenience stores and post offices as alternatives to courier services.

Taiwan 

Circles.Life launched its digital services in Taiwan with a no-contract base plan. The infrastructure partner uses Chunghwa Telecom's (CHT) network. Circles.Life offers an add-on option for data-heavy users, which for a monthly fee, users can add unlimited data to their base plans.

Australia 
Circles.Life launched its digital services in Australia through a strategic partnership with Optus.

Indonesia 
In 2020, Circles.Life launched its digital services "Live.On" in Indonesia. The infrastructure partner uses XL Axiata 4.5G network.

References

External links
 Official website
 Corporate website

2016 establishments in Singapore
Singaporean companies established in 2016
Telecommunications companies of Singapore
Mobile virtual network operators
Internet in Singapore
Singaporean brands